Dalbergia yunnanensis is a plant species of the genus Dalbergia: which is placed in the subfamily Faboideae and tribe Dalbergieae.

Subspecies 
The Catalogue of Life lists:
 D. yunnanensis var. collettii (Prain) Thoth.
 D. yunnanensis var. yunnanensis Franch.

References

External links

yunnanensis
Flora of China
Flora of Myanmar